This image has been scanned illegally from a book. Notice whoever did this does not credit the publisher. The mechanical screen is seen very visibly.

The Solothurn Madonna is a 1522 painting produced by Hans Holbein the Younger in Basel. It shows the Virgin Mary and Christ enthroned, flanked by Martin of Tours (shown as a bishop giving alms to a beggar) and Ursus of Solothurn (shown as a soldier in armour). Holbein used his wife Elsbeth as his model for the Madonna, and the baby "may well have been modelled on Holbein and Elsbeth's baby son Philipp."

The church which originally commissioned it is unknown, but it resurfaced in 1864 in poor condition in the Allerheiligenkapelle in the Grenchen district of Solothurn. It has been owned by the town of Solothurn since 1879, and it has been named after the town since the late 19th century. It is kept in the Solothurn Art Museum. After the Darmstadt Madonna, the Solothurn Madonna is the second largest surviving Madonna by Hans Holbein the Younger.

References

Bibliography (in German)
 Jacob Amiet: Hans Holbein's Madonna von Solothurn Und der Stifter Nicolaus Conrad, Solothurn, 1879. Reprint: Bibliolife, LaVergne, 2011.
 Oskar Bätschmann, Pascal Griener: Hans Holbein d.J. – Die Solothurner Madonna. Eine Sacra Conversazione im Norden, Basel, 1998. 
 Jochen Sander: Hans Holbein d. J. und die niederländische Kunst, am Beispiel der "Solothurner Madonna" in: Zeitschrift für Schweizerische Archäologie und Kunstgeschichte 55 (1998), S. 123–130.

External links
 Museums-Gesellschaft Grenchen
 Die schönste Grenchnerin wohnt in Solothurn (PDF; 211 kB)

Paintings by Hans Holbein the Younger
1522 paintings
Paintings of the Madonna and Child